Ahn Ji-ho (born 5 January, 2004) is a South Korean actor.

Filmography

Film

Television series

Web series

Awards and nominations

References

External links 
 

2004 births
Living people
South Korean male film actors
South Korean male television actors